Like the Wind may refer to:
 "Like the Wind" (song), a 1999 Belgian song featured in the Eurovision Song Contest
 "The Most Mysterious Song on the Internet", a 1980s rock song by an unknown artist
 Like the Wind (film), a 2013 Italian biopic